The Devil Inside Me is a 2011 Chinese horror thriller film directed by Zhang Qi and starring Tony Leung and Kelly Lin.

Plot
Lin Yan (Kelly Lin) is a beautiful woman who has fallen into dire straits as a result of a heart transplant that is gradually turning into another person. Yan believes that all the strange things that she encounters are the result of the heart transplant and that she is becoming the deceased owner of the heart Jiang Beiyan (Anya). Due to memory of the heart, Yan gradually sees different memories of Beiyan and under heavy mental pressure, she develops hallucinations and always feeling that Beiyan is around her. Also because of the memory of the heart, Yan thinks that her face is Beiyan and thinks she sees Beiyan while looking at herself in the mirror and pursues her memories and finds help from Beiyan's boyfriend Ma Benke (Huang Weide). In reality, it is physician Jiang Mu (Tony Leung) who is manipulating everything from behind. Mu knows that he has brain cancer and does not have much time left and uses Yan as his experimental target to verify that his "heart memory" theory is feasible and to extend the life of her lover, Beiyan. Mu gave Benke a heart injected with a large dose of anesthetic and yielded his heart to Benke hoping to revive himself in Benke's body so he can live a happy life with Beiyan.

Cast
Tony Leung Ka-fai as Jiang Mu
Kelly Lin as Lin Yan
Huang Weide as Ma Benke
Anya Wu as Jiang Beiyan
Zhang Qi as Officer Fang
Ying Da

External links

The Devil Inside Me at Hong Kong Cinemagic

2011 films
2011 horror films
2011 horror thriller films
Chinese horror thriller films
Chinese mystery thriller films
2010s mystery thriller films
2010s Mandarin-language films
Films set in China
Films shot in China